Brothers of the West is a 1937 American Western film produced and directed by Sam Katzman filmed at the Brandeis Ranch at Chatsworth, Los Angeles.

Plot
In order to help pay his mortgage, Ed Wade acts as an escort to a payroll. After bandits kill Ed's employer, Ed hides the payroll before he his captured. Ed's brother Tom, a range detective of the Cattleman's Protective Association is called by Ed's wife to find him.

Cast 
 Tom Tyler as Tom Wade
 Lois Wilde as Celia Chandler
 Dorothy Short as Annie Wade, Ed's Wife
 Lafe McKee as Sheriff Bains
 Bob Terry as Ed Wade, Tom's Brother
 Dave O'Brien as Bart, Tracy Henchman
 Roger Williams as Jeff Tracy, Attorney
 Jim Corey as Larry, Tracy Henchman
 James C. Morton as Cattle Man's Protective Assoc. Chief
 Jack "Tiny" Lipson as Jake the Hobo

Notes

External links 
 
 

1937 films
1937 Western (genre) films
American Western (genre) films
American black-and-white films
Films directed by Sam Katzman
Victory Pictures films
1930s English-language films
1930s American films